Mark Cox (born 1956 in East St. Louis, Illinois) is an American poet.

Life
He graduated from DePauw University and Vermont College with an MFA.

He teaches in the Department of Creative Writing at University of North Carolina Wilmington, and Vermont College.

He served as poetry editor of Passages North and Cimarron Review.

He lives in Wilmington, North Carolina, with his children, Austin, Rachel and Keith.

Awards
 1987 Whiting Award
 Pushcart Prize
 Oklahoma Book Award
 The Society of Midland Authors Poetry Prize
 Summer 2000, he served as the 24th Poet-in-Residence at The Frost Place, Robert Frost's family home, in Franconia, New Hampshire.

Works
Four Poems from Numero Cinq
"Finish This", Slate, Feb. 12, 2002

Anthologies

References

External links
 http://www.markcoxpoet.com/
 http://writersalmanac.publicradio.org/index.php?date=1998/06/24
 https://web.archive.org/web/20130416004112/http://uncw.edu/writers/facstaff/cox.html
 http://www.meachamwriters.org/conversations/Cox_Mark_2011-10-28.htm
 http://howapoemhappens.blogspot.com/2010/06/mark-cox.html
 https://web.archive.org/web/20121229051551/http://www.vcfa.edu/node/232
 Whiting Foundation Profile

1956 births
Living people
American male poets
DePauw University alumni
Vermont College of Fine Arts alumni
Writers from Wilmington, North Carolina
Poets from North Carolina